Nimustine is a nitrosourea alkylating agent.

It is used to treat malignant brain tumors and has proven to be rather effective.

References

Alkylating antineoplastic agents
Nitrosamines
Nitrosoureas
Organochlorides
Pyrimidines
Ureas
Chloroethyl compounds